Thomas Edward Hutchinson (June 15, 1941 – May 5, 2007) was an American football wide receiver. He was son of Clifford Edward Hutchinson, and Sarah Elizabeth Semonas Hutchinson. He was an All-American receiver at the University of Kentucky and a member of their 1962 football team, known forever as the Thin Thirty.

He was drafted by the Cleveland Browns in the first round in the 1963 NFL Draft. He played for the Browns until the 1965 season. He played with the Atlanta Falcons in his final season in 1966.

Hutchinson died of cancer in May 2007.

External links

1941 births
2007 deaths
People from Stanford, Kentucky
American football wide receivers
Kentucky Wildcats football players
Players of American football from Kentucky
Cleveland Browns players
Atlanta Falcons players
Deaths from cancer in Kentucky